The Sears Craftsman 175 was a NASCAR Craftsman Truck Series race that took place at Chicago Motor Speedway. The race was only held during the 2000 and 2001 seasons.

In 2001, 16-year-old Kyle Busch dominated the race but ran out of fuel with 20 laps to go.

Past winners

2000: Race extended due to a green–white–checker finish.

Manufacturer wins

References

External links
 

NASCAR Truck Series races
Former NASCAR races
NASCAR races at Chicago Motor Speedway
2000 establishments in Illinois